Shreddies are a breakfast cereal first produced in Canada in 1939 by Nabisco. The Shreddies brand is held by Post Consumer Brands in Canada and elsewhere, and Nestlé in the United Kingdom and Ireland.

Manufacture 
In Canada, production began in 1939 at Lewis Avenue, Niagara Falls, Ontario. Shreddies were produced under the Nabisco name until the brand in Canada was purchased in 1993 by Post Cereals, whose parent company in 1995 became Kraft General Foods, which sold Post to Ralcorp in 2008 and is now Post Foods Canada Corp., a unit of Post Holdings, which was spun off from Ralcorp in 2012.

In the United Kingdom, the cereal was first produced by Nabisco's former UK division but was later made by Cereal Partners under the Nestlé brand at Welwyn Garden City. The factory opened in 1926 and began making Shreddies in 1953. The site was briefly owned by Rank Hovis McDougall in 1988, which sold it to Cereal Partners in 1990. Nestlé's site at Staverton, Wiltshire started making Shreddies in 1998, and all production was moved there in 2007.

Marketing in the United Kingdom 
For many years in the UK, the Shreddies boxes featured Tom and Jerry. They regularly featured gifts in the boxes featuring Tom and Jerry, such as glow-in-the-dark stickers sets and puzzle books.
In around 1992, Frosted Shreddies had the mascot of Jack Frost, wearing a blue jumper, a red scarf, and red and light blue gloves.
From 1995, Shreddies' advertising campaigns featured an antagonist of a big teethed blue monster named Mr. Hungry who was a cartoon personification of "Hunger". His goal was to taunt hungry individuals by drumming on their stomachs with a pair of silver spoons after saying "Ha Ha! Hunger Strikes!" Mr. Hungry was then dispatched when the victim consumed a bowl of Shreddies, sealing him inside a cage. Despite his troublesome persona, Mr. Hungry was frequently used as a mascot for the cereal during this period. The message during this time was "Shreddies keep hunger locked up 'til lunch" and most ads ended with a box of Shreddies rolling up in front of Mr. Hungry, who then gets crushed between it and a box of Frosted Shreddies zooming in from behind him.
 For a while in the early 2000s, Frosted and Coco Shreddies were advertised as "too tasty for geeks". The advertisements featured "geeks" trying to eat a bowl of either Frosted or Coco Shreddies but being overwhelmed by its taste by being launched into the air like a rocket, followed by a much cooler kid named Sure-Eddie being able to easily eat the Shreddies. In 2003, Coco Shreddies were coated with more chocolate.
 In 2005, Shreddies were advertised as school fuel. The advertisements showed school children being focused on their work at school after eating a bowl of Shreddies for breakfast at home. This TV advertisement was ordered to be removed by the ASA as it was held to provide an unfair comparison between school children eating Shreddies or eating nothing, rather than a similar cereal.
In 2007, Shreddies' advertising centred on the claim that they are "knitted by nanas" with shots of a factory full of grandmothers knitting Shreddies. The ad was voted the seventh-favourite advertisement of 2007.   And from 2007 to 2011 the packaging was changed to include a photo, on the inner flaps, of the nana who apparently knitted the Shreddies for that specific box.
In 2010, supporting the launch of a new "Scrumptious new recipe", Shreddies launched a promotion to find new nanas, using TV, digital and Facebook; this subsequently built a huge fan base on Facebook. 
 In 2012, the Shreddies Knitting Nanas continued to be used to represent the brand.  The campaign was launched on Facebook to the fans in a 1-month build-up to the premiere, with the advertisement going live on TV weeks later in April.  The campaign message in 2012 was "Helping you through 'til lunch" (a reference to the early 90s strapline).
 A new advert in 2014 replaced the message with "Shreddies ...AND YOU'RE READY!" The advertisement features the song "This Is How We Do It" by Montell Jordan.
 August 2017 marked the end of the knitting nanas and was replaced by the "Shreddie or Not" campaign.
 In 2021, a new advertising campaign was launched featuring the television presenter Nick Knowles. This tied in with a redesign of the cereal box that was rolled out towards the end of the previous year, and introduced the new slogan "Shreddie For Anything".

Recreating Shreddies featured as a challenge in Channel 4's Snackmasters programme in 2019, featuring chefs Daniel Clifford and Claude Bosi (who had lost their respective previous episodes involving Kit Kat and Burger King respectively). The programme also looked at the production of Shreddies, including the raw ingredients and the extrusion process. The "knitted by nanas" campaign was also briefly shown. Daniel won the challenge by default due to Claude failing to make any replica Shreddies in time on account of an incorrect method to make them with and running out of wheat.

Collectables
In January 2012, boxes of Shreddies dating from the early 1970s were reported to be selling on eBay, after being discovered in a village shop. They were reported to have been selling for about £160 per box.

See also

 Chex
 List of breakfast cereals

References

External links
 Official website – Post Consumer Brands, Canada
 Official website – Nestlé, UK

1939 establishments in Ontario
Canadian cuisine
Post cereals
Nestlé cereals
Products introduced in 1955